GOVA, formerly known as Greater Sudbury Transit, is a public transport authority that is responsible for serving bus routes in Greater Sudbury, Ontario, Canada and area. The network is the largest in Northern Ontario, comprising 41 routes operating between the hours of 5:00am to 10:00pm for regular service and from 10:00pm to 2:00am for night service. Due to the increase in ridership the service has been approved for articulating buses primarily used for the largest routes and during rush-hour times. The annual ridership for the year of 2014 was recorded at 5 million passengers at an estimate of 16,000 daily.

The service rebranded as GOVA in August 2019. The new name was selected to work bilingually, by pairing the English verb "go" with its French equivalent "va".

Overview
Greater Sudbury Transit features over 90 buses on 41 routes servicing the city centre and outlying neighbourhoods such as Capreol, Chelmsford, Lively and Falconbridge.  Greater Sudbury Transit also provides door-to-door services for persons with physical disabilities known as Handi-Transit.

The bus fleet consists of 40' low floor buses from Orion with the Orion VI, NovaBus LFS and New Flyer D40LF buses that are in active service.

As of August 2010, the Greater Sudbury Transit bus fleet is compromised entirely of low floor "wheelchair accessible" buses - making Greater Sudbury Transit the first transit authority in all of Ontario to have an "Easier Access" bus fleet.

In 2006, Greater Sudbury Transit introduced five 40' coach-style buses from Nova Bus into its fleet. These buses service the city's longest routes, such as routes 701-Lively, 702-Azilda/Chelmsford, and 703-Val Caron/Hanmer/Capreol, providing increased comfort for those riders travelling long distances.  These buses, which are described as having a "suburban-style interior", luggage racks, LED reading lights above each seat, and comfortable bucket seats with added cushioning.

Most routes meet at the Transit Centre in downtown Sudbury (the 103-Coniston and 303-Garson/Falconbridge depart from the New Sudbury Centre Monday to Saturday), and service is provided from 6:15 am to 12:30 am 7 days a week, 363 days a year. Bus service is limited to 6:15 pm on Christmas Eve. There is no bus service on Christmas Day. Private charters can also be arranged.

Greater Sudbury Transit also operates a trans-cab service for any outlying area which does not receive bus service (including Long Lake, Richard Lake, Radar Base, Skead, Wahnapitae, Whitefish and Dowling) which provides a taxi from the individual's home to a transit bus stop.

As of December 1, 2009, Greater Sudbury Transit buses feature a fully operational audio/visual stop announcement system for passengers who are hearing and/or visually impaired. The stop announcement system also helps non-disabled passengers who are not familiar with a bus route of the transit system if they are not sure where it is they need to get off at to reach their destination.

As of April 12, 2012, Greater Sudbury Transit has guaranteed seven bus routes (101, 182, 301, 501, 701, 702, 703) that will always be equipped with bike racks.  Cyclists wishing to bring their bikes on other routes are permitted to bring their bike on-board according to the driver's discretion (e.g. not during rush-hour etc.).  City staff have indicated that following the construction to the new transit garage there will theoretically be sufficient space within to equip the whole fleet with bike racks.  There is not enough space within the current garage to accommodate the additional 0.8 m required per bus with a bike rack.

In 2018, it was announced that the City of Greater Sudbury had created a $99 million transit stimulus fund to be spent over a period of 10 years, $72 million of which was contributed by the federal and provincial governments, with the remainder being contributed by the city itself. Some ideas which were considered included a switch to electric buses (which would make Greater Sudbury Transit one of the first transit agencies in Canada to do so), improvements to cycling-transit integration, adoption of "smart" fare card technology, and a renewal of the existing diesel bus fleet.

In February 2019, major changes were announced for the service to be supported by the $99 million fund, which would see the creation of a new bus route, more frequent service (especially on Sundays), more early morning service, fare reductions, and a restructuring of the entire local transit system around three major hubs, rather than the single downtown terminal. These hubs would include the existing terminal as well as one in New Sudbury and another at the south end of the city.

History
Transit services in Sudbury began with the Sudbury & Copper Cliff Suburban Electric Railway (11 November 1915 - Fall 1951). The SCCSER acquired a secondary system, City Bus Lines (1947–1950), in 1950. In the fall of 1951, the company reorganized as Sudbury Bus Lines Limited (1951–1966). This later became an umbrella corporation, Laurentian Transit (Sudbury) Limited (1966–1972), for the joint operation of transit in Sudbury by Nickel Belt Coach Lines, Local Lines Limited, and DeLongchamp Cartage Company. Until 1972 the system was privately operated, but in that year it was taken over by the City of Sudbury Community Services Department under the name of Sudbury Transit (1972–2000). Sudbury Transit served an area population of 92,000 with a vehicle fleet of 33 buses and employed 103 workers (1991).

The transit system in and around Sudbury today was formed in 2000 during the amalgamation of the cities and towns of the Regional Municipality of Sudbury by combining the existing Sudbury bus service with the surrounding commuter bus lines of Rayside-Balfour, Valley East, and Walden. Thus, Greater Sudbury Transit has an enormous service area for its fleet.

The original Sudbury Transit logo was designed by renowned designer Stuart Ash in 1972. The agency later used the municipal logo of Greater Sudbury on its vehicles rather than a distinct transit-specific logo.

In 2019, the service rebranded as GOVA. Alongside the rebranding, the routes were reorganized to increase efficiency of travel; instead of the former model where all bus routes travelled to and from downtown, the new model features a number of selected high-frequency bus lines along major arterial routes, paired with collector buses that interchange with the high-frequency routes at one of several transit hubs in the city rather than directly travelling downtown.

Past names
 Sudbury & Copper Cliff Suburban Electric Railway (1915–1951)
 Sudbury Bus Lines, Ltd. (1951–1966)
 Laurentian Transit (Sudbury) Ltd. (1966–1972)
 Sudbury Transit (Sudbury) Ltd. (1972–2000)
 Greater Sudbury Transit (2000–2019)

Fleet 
GOVA has a fleet of 59 buses.

Current routes

Regular Routes (Monday-Saturday service)

1 Main Line 
High frequency South End to New Sudbury Centre

2 Barry Downe / Cambrian 
High frequency Downtown Sudbury to Cambrian College

3 Laurentian University via Regent 
Sudbury Outpatient Centre, Extendicare York, Health Sciences North

4 Laurentian University via Paris 
High frequency Downtown Sudbury to Health Sciences North and Laurentian University

10 Minnow Lake 
Downtown Sudbury to Moonlight at Bancroft, Finlandia Village

11 Donovan / Collège Boréal 
Downtown Sudbury, Collège Boréal, New Sudbury Centre, Cambrian College

12 Second Avenue 
Downtown Sudbury, SilverCity Cinemas, Costco, New Sudbury Centre

13 Copper Cliff 
Downtown Sudbury, Lorne Street

14 Four Corners 
Downtown Sudbury, South End Walmart, Southview Drive, Kelly Lake Road, Charlotte Street, Wembley Street

20 Graywood / Madison Local 
Loop to/from New Sudbury Centre

22 Grandview Local 
New Sudbury Centre, Holland, Woodbine, Rideau

23 New Sudbury Local 
New Sudbury Centre, Costco, Hawthorne, Westmount

24 Cambrian Heights Local 
Downtown Sudbury, Sudbury Tax Centre, Kathleen Street, Bruce Street

25 West End Local 
Downtown Sudbury, Elm Street, Whittaker Street, Willard, Victoria Street

26 McKim Local 
Downtown Sudbury, Kathleen Street, Frood Road, Ethelbert, Elm Street

27 Flour Mill 
Downtown Sudbury, Ste. Anne Road, MacKenzie, Morin, Percy, Murray

28 South End Local 
South End Walmart, Loach's Road, Oriole, Algonquin Road, Countryside Drive

29 Matindale Local 
South End Walmart, Regent, Southview Dr, Martindale Rd, Health Sciences North

101 Lively 
Departs from Downtown Transit Hub, Copper Cliff, Lively, Dogpatch, Atikmeksheng Native Reserve, Naughton Community Centre, Transcab Service to Whitefish

102 Garson 
Loop to New Sudbury Centre

103 Coniston 
Loop to New Sudbury Centre

104 Azilda / Chelmsford 
Downtown Sudbury, St. Agnes Street, Place Bonaventure, St. Onge Street

105 Valley 
Capreol, Blezard Valley, Hanmer Valley Shopping Centre, Val-Est Mall, Downtown Sudbury

See also

 Public transport in Canada

References

External links
 Greater Sudbury Transit
 Transit History of Sudbury, Ontario
 Greater Sudbury Transit at Tomsbuspage
 Drawings and photos of Greater Sudbury Transit buses

Transit agencies in Ontario
Bus transport in Greater Sudbury
Public transport in Greater Sudbury